Alberts Ozoliņš (10 May 1896 – 28 February 1985) was a Latvian weightlifter who competed for Latvia at the 1924 Summer Olympics in Paris at age 27.

Born in Kūkas Parish, Ozoliņš was a silver medalist in the men's middleweight division at the 1922 World Weightlifting Championships in Tallinn, Estonia and a bronze medalist at the 1923 World Weightlifting Championships in Vienna, Austria. Ozoliņš was a men's middleweight class wrestler and placed at number 25 at the 1924 Summer Olympics. He died in Jūrmala in 1985.

References

External links
 
 

1896 births
1985 deaths
Latvian male weightlifters
Olympic weightlifters of Latvia
Weightlifters at the 1924 Summer Olympics
People from Jēkabpils
20th-century Latvian people